Reginald was an Irish priest in the early thirteenth century: the earliest recorded Archdeacon of Ferns from 1223 to 1230.

References

Archdeacons of Ferns